Delusion ( for Pretense or Faking) is a 1998 Croatian crime-drama film directed by Zeljko Senecic.

Plot
Joža (Božidar Orešković), a middle-aged professional driver, offers Stella (Sandra Lončarić), a young and attractive prostitute, a ride from Zadar to Zagreb. Joža remembers his traumatic war experiences and his son who returned from combat with a severe disability. Underneath her seemingly cold and calculated demeanor, Stella is also a grieving parent. During the ride, the two develop a special relationship.

Cast
 Slobodan Dimitrijevic
 Jagoda Kaloper
 Filip Sovagovic
 
 Bozidar Oreskovic
 Tatjana Bertok
 Ivan Marevich
 Suzana Nikolic

Reception

Awards and nominations
The film won Sandra Lončarić the Golden Arena for Best Actress at the 1998 Pula Film Festival.

References

External links
 

1998 films
1990s Croatian-language films
Croatian drama films
1998 drama films